Epermenia meyi is a moth in the family Epermeniidae. It was described by Reinhard Gaedike in 2004. It is found in Ethiopia, Kenya and Malawi.

References

Epermeniidae
Moths described in 2004
Moths of Sub-Saharan Africa
Lepidoptera of Ethiopia
Lepidoptera of Kenya
Lepidoptera of Malawi